Bartolena is an Italian surname. Notable people with the surname include:

Cesare Bartolena (1830–1903), Italian painter
Giovanni Bartolena (1886–1942), Italian painter, grandson of Cesare

Italian-language surnames